Love and Theft may refer to:

Love and Theft (Bob Dylan album), 31st album of Bob Dylan
Love and Theft (duo), an American country music band 
Love and Theft (Love and Theft album), the band's self-titled album